James West Fraser (born February 3, 1955) is an American artist. One of the leading artists in the representational/En Plein Air tradition, Fraser has built his career on richly painted, atmospheric vistas of cities, coasts, and the landscape.

Biography

Early life 
West Fraser was born in Savannah, Georgia. Born to Joseph Bacon Fraser, Jr and Carolyn Bexley. Fraser attended the Savannah Country Day School, and was raised in nearby Hinesville until 1964, when his family moved to Hilton Head Island, South Carolina. He graduated from the University of Georgia with a Bachelor of Fine Art's degree in 1979. The following year in Savannah, he worked independently as an illustrator and began his first serious painting in watercolors. 1980–1984, he lived in Buck's County, Pennsylvania, and began traveling up and down the New England coast to paint maritime subjects and harbor scenes. In 1984, he settled in Charleston, South Carolina and continued his work in watercolor through the late 1980s. The realistic, detailed marine compositions from this period resulted in early critical recognition, with a 1984 two-man show at the Grand Central Art Galleries in New York City, and his first one-man exhibition at the Gibbes Museum of Art in Charleston in 1986 through early 1987.

Career 
By 1986 Fraser had already evolved in a looser, more lyrical watercolor style, and by 1989 had started producing his first oil paintings created from life in open air—En Plein Air—a style based on an impressionistic rendering of light, color and atmosphere on the forms of landscapes, city scenes, and marine views. Since then he has explored his vision in this vein — constantly developing his formal and expressive skills in portraying subjects ranging from panoramic urban rooftop views, to intimate streetscapes, to remote island marshlands. Working in plain air liberated Fraser from his studio, placing him into the rich fabric of urban life, or by contrast, into unspoiled natural environments, where he has recreated the light and colors of seasons, times of day, and varied atmospheric effects on landscapes and city scenes.

In 1990, he shifted to representational/plain air painting in oil. Since then, he has primarily specialized in coastal landscapes, streetscapes and travel paintings. Through his many accolades and awards, he has achieved a national and international reputation as a master of creating a natural light in his luminist paintings. Fraser has had 8 solo museum exhibitions in the Midwest, the Southeast, and California. Fraser has been published extensively, including features in Art & Antiques, Plain Air Magazine, The Robb Report, Southern Accents, American Artist, Nautical Quarterly, Southwest Art and Hemispheres, to name a few. In 2000, he represented South Carolina in the bicentennial celebration calendar published by the White House Historical Association. In 2001, the University of South Carolina Press published the monograph Charleston in My Time: The Paintings of West Fraser, which was accompanied by a traveling exhibition to Southeastern museums. In 2006, Fraser painted the official portrait of SC Governor Mark Sanford.

Honors and awards 
Fraser was a Commissioner of the South Carolina Art's Commission from 2003 to 2012, he is an elected member of the Salmagundi Club, an elected Fellow of the American Society of Marine Artists, a Signature member of Plein Air Painters of America (PAPA), and a member of the California Art Club.

He garnered his first award in 1984, The John Young Hunter Award from Allied Artists of America. Since then he has been honored with the Award of Excellence from Mystic International, The Mary S. Litt Award from the American Watercolor Society, the Pursuit of Excellence/American Master award from the Hubbard Museum of Art, and the Edgar Payne Gold Medal Award for Best Landscape from the California Art Club's 100th Juries Gold Medal Exhibition, among many others.

Fraser hangs in permanent collections in 9 museums across the United States and Bermuda, and at the White House Historical Association. His audiences include museums, art associations, resorts, the Heritage annual PGA Tour winner, yacht clubs, historical societies, health institutions, corporate and private collections, and educational institutions.

Permanent museum collections 
 Gibbs Museum of Art
 Greenville County Museum of Art
 Laguna Art Museum
 Masterworks Museum Collection, Hamilton, Bermuda
 Midway Museum, Midway, GA
 Mission San Juan Capistrano
 Morris Museum of Art
 Springfield Museum of Art, Springfield, OH
 Telfair Museum of Art
 White House Historical Association

Publications

Personal life

Daniel West Fraser Scholarship Fund
West, his family and friends established the Daniel West Fraser Scholarship Fund through the Gibbes Museum of Art to honor the memory of his eldest son Daniel. The fund serves to fulfill the Gibbes’ commitment to provide scholarship funding for art camps and classes to deserving, talented students from area schools who are recommended by their teachers.

The Joseph Bacon and Carolyn Bexley Fraser Sustainable Seafood Harvest Fund
West Fraser partner with the Community Foundation of the Lowcountry to established a fund for conservation, research, and to support sustainable seafood harvests around Beaufort County water into the future. The mission of The Joseph Bacon and Carolyn Bexley Fraser Sustainable Seafood Harvest Fund, established in the name of West's mother and father, is to provide support for conservation programs and efforts which are focused on maintaining the Port Royal Basin, the Calibogue Sound Basin, and the surrounding areas, as a healthy ecosystems and viable estuaries for a sustainable seafood harvest today and into the future.“ Proceeds from prints of Bluffton Oyster Factory Shuckers go towards the fund.

References

Further reading

External links 
 

People from Savannah, Georgia
Living people
Artists from Georgia (U.S. state)
American landscape painters
1955 births
University of Georgia alumni
Artists from Charleston, South Carolina